The Slovenian Figure Skating Championships is a figure skating competition held annually to crown the national champions of Slovenia. The event has been held under this name since 1992. From 1985 to 1991, it was called the Slovenian Republic Championships.

Medalists

Men

* - Withdrew after short program

Ladies

References

External links
 Slovene Skating Union
 
 2011–12 results

Figure skating national championships
Figure skating in Slovenia